The 1995–96 OHL season was the 16th season of the Ontario Hockey League. The league expanded as the Barrie Colts entered into the central division. The Detroit Junior Red Wings become the Detroit Whalers. Seventeen teams each played 66 games. The Peterborough Petes won the J. Ross Robertson Cup, defeating the Guelph Storm.

Expansion

Barrie Colts
On May 6, 1994, The Barrie Colts were approved as an expansion team in the Ontario Hockey League beginning in the 1995-96 season. The Colts began their inaugural season playing in the Barrie Arena, however, on December 31, 1995, the Colts moved into their new home, the Barrie Molson Centre. The Colts joined the Central Division.

Rebranding

Detroit Junior Red Wings to Detroit Whalers
At the conclusion of the 1994-95, the Detroit Junior Red Wings severed all ties with the National Hockey League Detroit Red Wings, as Peter Karmanos renamed the franchise the Detroit Whalers.

The Whalers moved out of Joe Louis Arena and into the Palace of Auburn Hills, home of the Detroit Pistons of the National Basketball Association and the Detroit Vipers of the International Hockey League. The Whalers would play 21 of their 33 home games in the regular season at the Palace of Auburn Hills while playing their remaining 12 home games at Oak Park Ice Arena. The Whalers played all of their home playoff games at the Oak Park Ice Arena.

The club remained in the West Division.

Regular season

Final standings
Note: DIV = Division; GP = Games played; W = Wins; L = Losses; T = Ties; OTL = Overtime losses; GF = Goals for; GA = Goals against; PTS = Points; x = clinched playoff berth; y = clinched division title; z = earned first round bye

East Division

Central Division

West Division

Scoring leaders

Playoffs

Division quarter-finals

East Division

(2) Peterborough Petes vs. (5) Kingston Frontenacs

(3) Belleville Bulls vs. (4) Oshawa Generals

Central Division

(2) Kitchener Rangers vs. (5) Barrie Colts

(3) Niagara Falls Thunder vs. (4) Owen Sound Platers

West Division

(1) Detroit Whalers vs. (4) Windsor Spitfires

(2) Sarnia Sting vs. (3) Sault Ste. Marie Greyhounds

OHL quarter-finals

(C1) Guelph Storm vs. (C3) Niagara Falls Thunder

(W1) Detroit Whalers vs. (C2) Kitchener Rangers

(E1) Ottawa 67's vs. (E3) Belleville Bulls

(W2) Sarnia Sting vs. (E2) Peterborough Petes

OHL semi-finals

(C1) Guelph Storm vs. (E3) Belleville Bulls

(W1) Detroit Whalers vs. (E2) Peterborough Petes

J. Ross Robertson Cup

(C1) Guelph Storm vs. (E2) Peterborough Petes

All-Star teams

First team
Alyn McCauley, Centre, Ottawa 67's
Daniel Cleary, Left Wing, Belleville Bulls
Cameron Mann, Right Wing, Peterborough Petes
Bryan Berard, Defence, Detroit Whalers
Kevin Bolibruck, Defence, Peterborough Petes
Craig Hillier, Goaltender, Ottawa 67's
Brian Kilrea, Coach, Ottawa 67's

Second team
Aaron Brand, Centre, Sarnia Sting
Sean Haggerty, Left Wing, Detroit Whalers
Jeff Johnstone, Right Wing, Niagara Falls Thunder
Sean Brown, Defence, Sarnia Sting
Jay McKee, Defence, Niagara Falls Thunder
Dan Cloutier, Goaltender, Guelph Storm
Bert Templeton, Coach, Barrie Colts

Third team
Sean Venedam, Centre, Sudbury Wolves
Jamie Wright, Left Wing, Guelph Storm
David Nemirovski, Right Wing, Sarnia Sting
Marc Moro, Defence, Kingston Frontenacs
Ryan Risidore, Defence, Guelph Storm
David Belitski, Goaltender, Kitchener Rangers
Travis Scott, Goaltender, Oshawa Generals
Mark Hunter, Coach, Sarnia Sting

Awards

1996 OHL Priority Selection
On June 1, 1996, the OHL conducted the 1996 Ontario Hockey League Priority Selection at the Kitchener Memorial Auditorium in Kitchener, Ontario. The London Knights held the first overall pick in the draft and selected Rico Fata from the Sault Ste. Marie Greyhounds. Fata was awarded the Jack Ferguson Award, awarded to the top pick in the draft.

Below are the players who were selected in the first round of the 1996 Ontario Hockey League Priority Selection.

See also
List of OHA Junior A standings
List of OHL seasons
1996 Memorial Cup
1996 NHL Entry Draft
1995 in sports
1996 in sports

References

HockeyDB

Ontario Hockey League seasons
OHL